James Henry Forrest was an English professional footballer who made over 120 appearances as a right half in the Football League for Clapton Orient. He also played league football for Northampton Town.

Personal life 
Forrest served as a gunner in the British Army during the First World War.

Career statistics

Honours 
Sunderland West End

 Monkwearmouth Charity Cup

References

English footballers
English Football League players
Year of death missing
Leyton Orient F.C. players
British Army personnel of World War I
1892 births
People from Shildon
Footballers from County Durham
Association football wing halves
Northampton Town F.C. players
Spennymoor United F.C. players